Arthur Alvin Lenroot Jr. (February 18, 1912 – July 8, 1997) was a Republican member of the Wisconsin Senate, representing the 11th district from 1947 to 1955.

He was born in Superior, Wisconsin, and went to University of St. Thomas and University of Wisconsin–Superior. He worked for a railroad and an oil company and was an abstractor and involved in conservation and the tourism industry. Lenroot also served in the Wisconsin State Assembly in 1942 and 1944 and was a delegate to the 1948 Republican National Convention. According to the Wisconsin Blue Book, he was elected in 1946 and re-elected in 1950, but was defeated in 1954 by Democrat Carl Lauri. He died in Santa Rosa, California.

References 

Republican Party members of the Wisconsin State Assembly
Republican Party Wisconsin state senators
1912 births
1997 deaths
Politicians from Superior, Wisconsin
University of St. Thomas (Minnesota) alumni
University of Wisconsin–Superior alumni
Businesspeople from Wisconsin
20th-century American businesspeople
20th-century American politicians